MasterChef Junior is an American cooking competition involving children from the ages of 8–13 that premiered on Fox on September 27, 2013. It is based on the format of the British series Junior MasterChef.

On March 5, 2014, MasterChef Junior was renewed for a third season before production on season two began. The second season premiered on November 4, 2014. The third season premiered on January 6, 2015. The fourth season premiered on November 6, 2015. The fifth season premiered on February 9, 2017. The sixth season premiered on March 2, 2018. On February 13, 2019, it was announced that the seventh season would premiere with a two-episode special on March 12, 2019, with the judges being Gordon Ramsay, Christina Tosi, and Aarón Sánchez.

In July 2019, it was announced that the show would be returning for an eighth season, with Ramsay and Sánchez as returning judges, along with new judge Daphne Oz replacing Tosi. The season premiered on March 17, 2022.

Format
Any child between ages eight and thirteen can apply to become a contestant on the series by applying online or by going to an open casting call. The contestants are announced through a variety of methods over the years, sometimes via competitions, or sometimes the top contestants are simply announced.

As in its parent show MasterChef, the following challenges have all been regularly featured on the show:

 Skills Test: Cooks are challenged to prepare foods in accordance with a list of common cooking techniques or styles, or to replicate a particular cooking method of a dish (i.e. steaks done to an exact wellness). This type of test is also sometimes used as an Elimination Test.
 Mystery Box: Cooks are all given a box with the same ingredients and must use only those ingredients to create a dish within a fixed amount of time. The judges will select three dishes based on visual appearance and technique alone to taste, and from these three select one winner who usually gains an advantage of some type in the elimination test.
 Elimination Test: After the challenge is explained, judges evaluate all dishes based on taste and visual appeal. The judges nominate the worst dishes for elimination and criticize them before eliminating at least one contestant.
 Team Challenge: The cooks are split into teams by either team captains or the judges. They often occur in a restaurant takeover or pop-up restaurant taking the place of the staff of a particular restaurant. Diners taste both meals and vote for their favorite. The winning team advances, while the losing team will participate in the Pressure Test or even face elimination based on team members' performance.
 Pressure Test: Another form of the Elimination Test, in which losing team members compete against each other to make a standard dish within a very limited amount of time that requires a great degree of cooking finesse. Each dish is judged on taste, visual appeal and technique, and the losing chef is eliminated.

Once the competition is reduced to either the final two or three competitors, the finalists will compete against each other in a three-course cook-off. All courses of the meal are judged and an overall winner is crowned. The winner of each season wins $100,000, the MasterChef Junior trophy, and the title of MasterChef Junior. Some seasons have also added other prizes.

Judges

Series overview

Seasons

Specials

Development

Casting
Like its adult counterpart, at its inception MasterChef Junior was judged by Gordon Ramsay, Joe Bastianich and Graham Elliot. Bastianich did not return for the show's fourth season, being replaced by prominent pastry chef Christina Tosi. Elliot did not return for the show's fifth season, and a series of rotating guest judges served for the third judge. For the sixth season, Bastianich returned to his judging position. In the seventh season, Bastianich left again and was replaced by Aarón Sánchez, who was one of the guest judges in season 5 as well as a judge on the adult MasterChef.

Production
Fox placed casting calls for participants in January 2013. Fox officially ordered the series (then under the name Junior MasterChef) on May 10, 2013. The name was later changed to MasterChef Junior. There were concerns that Ramsay's style of cursing at the contestants on his other competition shows (most notably Hell's Kitchen and the adult MasterChef) would carry over to MasterChef Junior. It did not. One contestant (named Gavin) said that Ramsay had only cursed twice during the production of the series and never at the contestants. In the final editing, he cursed once in front of (but not at) the contestants.

Season synopsis

Season 1 (2013)

The first season premiered on September 27, 2013, with chefs Gordon Ramsay, Graham Elliot and Joe Bastianich acting as the judges.

The winner of MasterChef Junior season 1 was Alexander Weiss, a thirteen-year-old from New York City.

Semifinalist Troy Glass is now an actor, appearing on Kids React and other cooking shows, and making cameos on shows like Agents of S.H.I.E.L.D.

Season 2 (2014)

The second season premiered on November 4, 2014, with chefs Gordon Ramsay, Graham Elliot and Joe Bastianich again acting as the judges.

The winner of MasterChef Junior season 2 was Logan Guleff, an eleven-year-old from Memphis, Tennessee.

Season 3 (2015)

The third season premiered on January 6, 2015, with chefs Gordon Ramsay, Graham Elliot and Joe Bastianich once again acting as the judges.

The winner of MasterChef Junior season 3 was Nathan Odom, a twelve-year-old from San Diego, California.

Season 4 (2015–16)

The fourth season premiered on November 6, 2015, with chefs Gordon Ramsay, Graham Elliot and Christina Tosi acting as the judges.

The winner of MasterChef Junior season 4 was Addison Smith, a nine-year-old from River Forest, Illinois.

Season 5 (2017)

The fifth season premiered on February 9, 2017, with chefs Gordon Ramsay and Christina Tosi acting as the judges, along with numerous guest judges including Julie Bowen and Mayim Bialik.

The winner of MasterChef Junior season 5 was Jasmine Stewart, an eleven-year-old from Milton, Georgia. She is the first previously eliminated contestant to win the competition.

Season 6 (2018)

The sixth season premiered on March 2, 2018, with returning chefs Gordon Ramsay and Christina Tosi acting as the judges, along with returning judge Joe Bastianich as the third judge.

The winner of MasterChef Junior season 6 was Beni Cwiakala, a nine-year-old from Chicago, Illinois.

Season 7 (2019)

The seventh season premiered on March 12, 2019, with returning chefs Gordon Ramsay and Christina Tosi acting as the judges, along with returning judge Aarón Sánchez as the third judge.

The winner of MasterChef Junior season 7 was Che Spiotta, a twelve-year-old from Boiceville, New York.

Season 8 (2022)

The eighth season premiered on March 17, 2022, with Gordon Ramsay and Aarón Sánchez as returning judges, along with new judge Daphne Oz replacing Christina Tosi.

The winner of MasterChef Junior season 8 was Liya Chu, a ten-year-old from Scarsdale, New York.

Television ratings
Seasonal rankings (based on average total viewers per episode) of MasterChef Junior on Fox.
Each US network TV season starts in late September and ends in late May, which coincides with the completion of May sweeps.

See also

 MasterChef (British TV series)
 MasterChef (American TV series)

References

External links
 
 
 MasterChef Junior at TV Guide
 MasterChef Junior at TV by the Numbers

 
American television spin-offs
American television series based on British television series
2013 American television series debuts
English-language television shows
Fox Broadcasting Company original programming
Television shows featuring audio description
Cooking competitions in the United States
2010s American cooking television series
2020s American cooking television series
Television series about children
Television series about teenagers